Ketil Askildt (24 November 1900 – 6 September 1978) was a Norwegian discus thrower.

At the 1924 Summer Olympics he finished fifth in the discus final with a throw of 43.40 metres. In addition he finished fifteenth in shot put. At the 1928 Summer Olympics he finished thirteenth in discus throw with 42.57 metres. He became Norwegian champion in discus throw in the years 1925-1927, 1929-1930 and 1931-1933.

His personal best throw was 46.48, achieved in August 1926 on Bislett Stadion.

References

External links
 

1900 births
1978 deaths
Norwegian male discus throwers
Athletes (track and field) at the 1924 Summer Olympics
Athletes (track and field) at the 1928 Summer Olympics
Olympic athletes of Norway